Ben Jordan Sampayo (born 10 December 1992) is an English footballer who plays for Bishop's Stortford.

He came through the youth team at Chelsea, where he won the FA Youth Cup in 2010. He then spent two seasons as a professional at Brighton & Hove Albion, though made only one FA Cup appearance for the club. He spent time on loan at Bishop's Stortford in 2013, before moving on to Chelmsford City and Greenock Morton. He picked up an injury at Morton, and went on to have brief non-playing spells with Grays Athletic, Dover Athletic, and Hemel Hempstead Town.

Career
Sampayo came through the Chelsea Academy, and was an unused substitute in both legs of the club's FA Youth Cup final victory over Aston Villa in 2010. He was released upon the expiry of his contract in June 2011. He was soon signed up to the Brighton & Hove Albion development squad, along with former Chelsea teammate Anton Rodgers. He made his first team debut for the "Seagulls" in a 1–1 draw with Wrexham in an FA Cup third round match at Falmer Stadium on 7 January 2012. On 29 March 2013, he joined Bishop's Stortford of the Conference South on loan until the end of the 2012–13 season. He was released by Brighton in the summer, having played only one game for the club.

He signed with Chelmsford City in August 2013 after impressing manager Dean Holdsworth in a trial game. He made six Conference South appearances for the "Clarets" in the 2013–14 season, before being released in October. He played in a behind-closed-doors friendly for Carlisle United in December 2013; Carlisle manager Graham Kavanagh said that "Ben showed a good attitude, got up and down well and is a nice footballer but we have decided not to take it any further". Sampayo won a professional contract with Scottish Championship side Greenock Morton the following month. He picked up a cruciate ligament injury in a reserve team game at Cappielow Park, and after being released by Morton admitted to feeling "very lonely, really isolated and depressed" as he struggled to prove his fitness to prospective clubs.

In September 2014, Sampayo returned to England and signed for Isthmian League Premier Division club Grays Athletic. Two months later he moved on to Conference Premier side Dover Athletic. In August 2015, he signed for National League South side Hemel Hempstead Town. He never played a league game for Grays, Dover, or Hemel Hempstead. He played a reserve team game with Port Vale in October 2016.

Career statistics

Honours
Chelsea
FA Youth Cup: 2009–10

References

1992 births
Living people
Footballers from Dagenham
Association football fullbacks
English footballers
Chelsea F.C. players
Brighton & Hove Albion F.C. players
Bishop's Stortford F.C. players
Chelmsford City F.C. players
Greenock Morton F.C. players
Grays Athletic F.C. players
Dover Athletic F.C. players
Hemel Hempstead Town F.C. players
Brentwood Town F.C. players
Heybridge Swifts F.C. players
East Thurrock United F.C. players
National League (English football) players
Scottish Professional Football League players
Aveley F.C. players